Arabesque  (ART) is an Arabic language pay-TV channel, owned by Arab Digital Distribution. 

Commonly known as ART, broadcasts via Hotbird and Nilesat satellites to the Middle East, North Africa and Europe. Its direct competitors in the Arab regions are Showtime Arabia and Orbit Communications Company. Access to the full package of channels is via an easily obtainable over the counter viewing card which counts down once activated in a suitable receiver. Cards are available in 3, 6 and 12 month formats.

External links
 The official homepage

Television networks